English Electric Part Two is the eighth studio album by the English progressive rock band Big Big Train. It was released on 4 March 2013, by English Electric Recordings and GEP.

Track listing

Personnel
Nick D'Virgilio –  drums, backing vocals
Dave Gregory – electric guitar, banjo, mellotron
David Longdon –  lead vocals, flute, vibes, tambourine, banjo, accordion, melodica, keyboards, acoustic guitar, birds and bees, mandolin
Danny Manners - keyboards, piano, double bass
Andy Poole –  keyboards, acoustic guitar, mandolin, backing vocals, baritone bee
Gregory Spawton –  bass guitar, electric guitar, slow moog, backing vocals, mandolin, acoustic guitar, keyboards

Guest musicians
 Abigail Trundle - cello
 Andy Tillison - organ, Moog, keyboards
 Ben Godfrey - cornet, trumpet, piccolo trumpet
 Daniel Steinhardt - electric guitar
 Dave Desmond - trombone
 Eleanor Gilchrist - violin
 Geraldine Berreen - violin
 Jan Jaap Langereis - recorders
 Jon Truscott - tuba
 John Storey - euphonium, trombone
 Lily Adams - backing vocals
 Martin Orford - backing vocals
 Rachel Hall - violin
 Sue Bowran - violin
 Teresa Whipple - viola
 Verity Joy - backing vocals
 Violet Adams - backing vocals

External links
 
 RadioShow: The European Perspective #161

References

Big Big Train albums
2013 albums